XEW is the call sign of the following broadcast stations in Mexico City, Mexico:

Television station XEW-TV, channel 2
Radio station XEW-AM, 900 kHz branded as W-Radio
Radio station XEW-FM, 96.9 MHz